The Sutton Community Hall is a historic municipal building in Sutton, Alaska. The building has entrances on the north, south and east sides, the east-facing one sheltered by a hood with diagonal bracing. The exterior has several types of cladding, including asphalt shingles and board-and-batten siding. The building was built in 1927 to serve as a bunkhouse for workers building the Eklutna Power Plant, and was moved to the present location in 1950 to serve the unincorporated community of Sutton as a meeting space. The hall served the community as its principal civic and social meeting space for forty years.

The building was listed on the National Register of Historic Places in 2013.  It was at that time unused and in deteriorating condition.

See also
National Register of Historic Places listings in Matanuska-Susitna Borough, Alaska

References

Government buildings on the National Register of Historic Places in Alaska
Government buildings completed in 1927
Buildings and structures on the National Register of Historic Places in Matanuska-Susitna Borough, Alaska
Relocated buildings and structures in Alaska
1927 establishments in Alaska
Community centers in the United States